MCND (acronym for "Music Creates New Dream") is a five-member South Korean boy band formed by the company TOP Media in 2020. The group debuted on February 27, 2020, with the song "Ice Age". The group is composed of members Castle J, Bic, Minjae, Huijun, and Win.

History

2020: Top Gang, debut with Into the Ice Age, "Spring", and Earth Age
On January 2, the group released the hip hop pre-debut single "Top Gang". The single was composed by member Castle J, and was written by Castle J, Bic and Win. The group had performed on Music Bank on December 13 and at Inkigayo on December 15, 2019.

The group made their official debut on February 27, with the EP Into the Ice Age and its lead single "Ice Age". Their debut showcase was held at Seoul's Yes24 Live Hall on February 26. On March 15, they hosted an online fansign, making them one of the first groups to embrace a virtual format for these events. They described the fansign as "a whole new experience."

On April 9, the group returned with the digital single "Spring".

On August 20, the group made their first comeback  with the new EP Earth Age and its lead single "Nanana". Notably, an AI hosted their comeback showcase, which the group has described as a "surprising and fun" experience, noting that it felt awkward but went "quite successfully."

The group did their first ever online concert "MCND 1st On:Live" on September 26, 2020, and it finished successfully. They have since called the concert one of their most "precious memories" as a group.

2021: MCND Age and The Earth: Secret Mission Chapter.1
Before making their second comeback, the group took some time off to improve their musical and performance skills. Castle J has shared that he "took vocal lessons [and] studied music a lot," and BIC worked on his performance.

On January 8, the group made their second comeback with their third EP MCND Age and its lead single "Crush". Win has called "Crush" one of his favorite MCND songs to date, saying it "seems to be a song of color that only MCND can release."

On August 31, MCND released their fourth EP The Earth: Secret Mission Chapter.1 and its lead single "Movin'". Win noted that their "worldview has been expanded" since their debut, allowing for more "stories and messages" to emerge in their work.

2022: [1st] MCND Tour and The Earth: Secret Mission Chapter.2 
On February 12, MCND had announced their first-ever offline concert titled, ‘MCND EUROPE TOUR 2022’, visiting a total six countries and seven cities.

On March 7, MCND announced their first tour in America. From the beginning of June, MCND will visit 10 cities in four countries including the US, Mexico, Canada and Brazil. This was later pushed back to August due to an administrative error.

On June 11, MCND released a track video titled "W.A.T.1" for their upcoming comeback, and officially released the schedule on June 15. Their fifth EP The Earth: Secret Mission Chapter.2 and its lead single "#Mood" was released on July 7.

On November 19, 2022, MCND held their first Asia tour in the Philippines at the SM North EDSA Skydome.

Members 
 Castle J (캐슬제이)
 Bic (빅)
 Minjae (민재)
 Huijun (휘준)
 Win (윈)

Discography

Extended plays

Singles

Music videos

Awards and nominations

References 

2020 establishments in South Korea
K-pop music groups
Musical groups established in 2020
Musical groups from Seoul
South Korean boy bands
South Korean dance music groups